William Edward Cleary (July 20, 1849 – December 20, 1932) was an American businessman and politician who served four terms as a U.S. Representative from New York from 1918 to 1921, and from 1923 to 1927.

Biography 
Born in Ellenville, New York, Cleary attended the public schools and the Ellenville Academy.
He moved to Brooklyn in 1879 and engaged in water transportation.
He served as vice president of the New York Board of Trade and Transportation.
He was a founder, and served as president, of the Victory Memorial Hospital.

Tenure in Congress 
Cleary was elected as a Democrat to the Sixty-fifth Congress to fill the vacancy caused by the resignation of Daniel J. Griffin.
He was reelected to the Sixty-sixth Congress and served from March 5, 1918, to March 3, 1921.
He was an unsuccessful candidate for reelection in 1920 to the Sixty-seventh Congress.

Cleary was elected to the Sixty-eighth and Sixty-ninth Congresses (March 4, 1923 – March 3, 1927).
He was not a candidate for reelection in 1926.

Later career and death 
He resumed his former business interests.
He died in Brooklyn, New York, December 20, 1932.
He was interred in Holy Cross Cemetery in Brooklyn.

Family legacy 
His grandson Stephen Edward Smith (1927–1990) was a brother-in-law and campaign manager for President John F. Kennedy.

References

1849 births
1932 deaths
Democratic Party members of the United States House of Representatives from New York (state)
Burials at Holy Cross Cemetery, Brooklyn